A New Breed of Female is the only studio album by American hip hop group II Tru. It was released on September 9, 1997 via Mo Thugs/Relativity Records. Recording sessions took place at Private Island Trax in Los Angeles. Production was primarily handled by Archie Blaine, as well as Krayzie Bone, who served as executive producer together with Layzie Bone. It features guest appearances from fellow Mo Thugs members Ken Dawg, Tombstone and Sin of the Graveyard Shift, Flesh-n-Bone, Layzie Bone and Krayzie Bone.

The album failed to live up to the expectations provided by the success of the platinum-selling Family Scriptures. It peaked at number 194 on the Billboard 200, dropping off the chart after only one week, and number 49 on the Top R&B/Hip-Hop Albums, dropping off after four weeks.

Along with a single, a music video was released for "Ballers Flossin", though it failed to make it to the Billboard charts. The album is currently unavailable on iTunes and Tidal.

Background
Composed of female rappers Belinda "Jhaz" Wallace and Cabrina "Brina" Wilson, II Tru were discovered by fellow Cleveland natives Bone Thugs-n-Harmony, who in turn invited the duo to join their newly formed collective, Mo Thugs Family. They made their debut on Mo Thugs' first album Family Scriptures, appearing on three songs. After the success of the album, Mo Thugs founders Krayzie Bone and Layzie Bone gave both II Tru and the Poetic Hustla'z a chance to record an album. A New Breed of Female was the first studio album released from the Mo Thugs collective when it was released on September 9, 1997.

Track listing

Personnel

Belinda "Jhaz" Wallace – main artist
Cabrina "Brina" Wilson – main artist
Anthony "Krayzie Bone" Henderson – featured artist (track 9), producer (tracks: 9, 13), executive producer
Steven "Layzie Bone" Howse – featured artist (track 9), executive producer
Paul "Tombstone" O'Neil – featured artist (tracks: 10, 12)
Actavius "Sin" Mills – featured artist (tracks: 10, 12)
Kendon "Ken Dawg" Anthony – featured artist (tracks: 12, 13)
Stanley "Flesh-n-Bone" Howse – featured artist (track 12)
Romeo Antonio – bass (tracks: 4, 8, 10, 13, 15), guitars (tracks: 4, 8, 13, 15)
Jimmy Zavala – saxophone (tracks: 5, 15), flute (tracks: 10, 15)
Hayes Branham – backing vocals (track 5)
Mike Smooth – bass & guitar (track 6)
Phat Vocals – chorus (track 13)
Earl Wagner – backing vocals (track 15)
Archie Blaine – producer (tracks: 2, 4-6, 8, 10-12, 14, 15)
Jeff Shirley – recording, mixing
Rod Mendoza – assistant recording
Steve Durkee – assistant mixing
David Bett – art direction
Randy Ronquillo – design
Peter Dokus – photography
Steve Lobel – A&R

Charts

References

External links

1997 debut albums
Relativity Records albums
Mo Thugs albums